The men's 30 kilometres walk event at the 1990 Commonwealth Games was held on 2 February in Auckland.

Results

References

30
1990